Dimitrios Soutzos was the mayor of Athens between 1879 and 1887.

Biography
He was the son of Skarlatos Soutzos, a descendant of the distinguished Phanariot Soutzos family who became a Major General in the Greek Army, and of Elpis Kantakouzinou, daughter of the magnate and freedom fighter Alexandros Kantakouzinos.

He was elected for the first time as mayor of Athens on 11 May 1879. Re-elected for the second term, he remained in office until 30 September 1887.

Mayors of Athens
Dimitrios
Year of death missing
Year of birth missing
Politicians from Athens